Dilwar Khan (1 January 1937 – 10 October 2013) was a Bangladeshi poet. Known as Gono Manusher Kobi (poet of the mass people), he was awarded Bangla Academy Literary Award in 1980 and Ekushey Padak in 2008 by the Government of Bangladesh.

Early life and career 

Khan was born in Bharthokhola, South Surma, Sylhet District, Bengal Presidency. He received a Bangla Academy Fellowship in 1981. Khan died on 10 October 2013.

References 

1937 births
2013 deaths
Bangladeshi male poets
People from Dakshin Surma Upazila
Recipients of the Ekushey Padak
Recipients of Bangla Academy Award
20th-century poets
20th-century male writers